Alain Cacheux (15 November 1947 – 26 July 2020) was a French politician and member of the National Assembly of France.  He represented the Nord department, and was a member of the Socialiste, radical, citoyen et divers gauche.

References

1947 births
2020 deaths
People from Valenciennes
Socialist Party (France) politicians
Deputies of the 13th National Assembly of the French Fifth Republic